Grammoechus triangulifer is a species of beetle in the family Cerambycidae. It was described by Ritsema in 1908. It is known from Borneo.

References

Pteropliini
Beetles described in 1908